Fore Church is a parish church of the Church of Norway in Meløy Municipality in Nordland county, Norway. It is located in the village of Reipå. It is one of the churches for the Fore og Meløy parish which is part of the Bodø domprosti (deanery) in the Diocese of Sør-Hålogaland. The white, wooden church was built in 1909 using plans drawn up by the architect O. M. Olsen. The church seats about 450 people.

History
The church was originally built in 1909 in a neo-gothic, long church style. It was consecrated on 17 June 1909. In 1932, the church was renovated and expanded by adding two transepts to give it a cruciform design.

See also
List of churches in Sør-Hålogaland

References

Meløy
Churches in Nordland
Wooden churches in Norway
Cruciform churches in Norway
20th-century Church of Norway church buildings
Churches completed in 1909
1909 establishments in Norway